Chapter 2: World Domination is the third studio album by American hip hop group Three 6 Mafia. The album was released on November 4, 1997, by Hypnotize Minds, with distribution from RED. This was their first widely distributed album and also Three 6 Mafia's first Gold-RIAA certified album, having sold over 800,000 copies in the US. This album is the last to feature a majority of darker beats, but also shows the group moving toward a more mainstream sound that would be heard on their 2000 album When the Smoke Clears: Sixty 6, Sixty 1. It incorporated reprises of four hits previously released on Mystic Stylez and Chapter 1: The End  — "Late Nite Tip", "N 2 Deep", "Body Parts" and "Tear Da Club Up".

Track listing
All tracks are produced by DJ Paul and Juicy J

Charts

Certifications

References

1997 albums
Three 6 Mafia albums
Horrorcore albums
Albums produced by DJ Paul
Albums produced by Juicy J